Belgium's busiest airports by passenger traffic:

At a glance

2017

2016

2015

References

Busy
Belgium
Belgium
Airports, Busy
Airports, busiest